The Córdoba International Animation Festival – ANIMA is a competitive animated film and media festival that is held in the city of Córdoba, Argentina every two years.

ANIMA's first edition was held in April 2001, and has been replicated in odd years since, therefore being Argentina's first and longest standing animation festival.  
The festival is jointly organized by the Centro Experimental de Animación (CEAn), an animation research and production center at the Faculty of Arts, Universidad Nacional de Córdoba; and the Animation Chair of the Universidad Nacional de Villa María.
The tenth and latest edition of ANIMA was held on October 9 through 11, 2019.

Overwiew 
ANIMA revolves around three dimensions:

 The festival itself, which welcomes all sorts of animation with no limitations to technique, genre, topic, format and/or screening media.
 Providing formative opportunities in animation, through seminars, workshops and masterclasses.
 An academic conference called FAIA – Foro Académico Internacional de Animación. Stablished in 2007, FAIA is the first Latin American conference on the subject. Proceedings of the conference are published both on paper and online editions.

List of ANIMA Prize winners

References

External links 
ANIMA's website

Animation film festivals
Film festivals in Argentina
Film festivals established in 2001
2001 establishments in Argentina
Córdoba, Argentina